Worlds Torn Asunder is the third album by the American thrash metal band Warbringer, released on September 27, 2011 via Century Media.

Track listing 
All lyrics by John Kevill, except "Sacrifice" by Quorthon. All music by Warbringer, except where noted.

Japanese edition

Personnel 
Warbringer
John Kevill – lead vocals
John Laux – guitars
Adam Carroll – guitars
Andy Laux –  bass
Carlos Cruz – drums

Production
Steve Evetts – production and mixing
Dan Seagrave – artwork

References 

2011 albums
Warbringer albums
Century Media Records albums
Albums with cover art by Dan Seagrave
Albums produced by Steve Evetts